Arthur Edgar Juve (1901–1965) was a B. F. Goodrich Director of Technology who developed oil-resistant rubber compositions, lab tests for tire treads, and improvements in manufacture of rubber products and the processing of synthetic rubber.

Education 

Juve obtained his BS in Chemical Engineering from Ohio State University in 1925.

Career 

By Jan 1926, Juve was employed at BF Goodrich in Ravenna, Ohio.

Juve held patents for halogenated rubber cements (1944), synthetic rubber offset printing blankets (1942), rubber rollers resistant to printing ink (1942), and the viscurometer, a specialized rheometer for rubber compounds undergoing crosslinking (1965).

While director of technical services at BF Goodrich's Brecksville research center, Juve served as Chairman of the ACS Rubber Division.

Awards and Recognitions

 1964 - Charles Goodyear Medal from the ACS Rubber Division

References 

1901 births
1965 deaths
Polymer scientists and engineers
American chemical engineers
20th-century American engineers